Gryllini is a tribe of crickets (Orthoptera: Ensifera) and typical of the family Gryllidae.  Species are terrestrial, carnivorous or omnivorous and can be found in all continenents except Antarctica.

Genera
The Orthoptera Species File lists:

subtribe Anurogryllina Randell, 1964 (Americas)
 Anurogryllus Saussure, 1877
 Hispanogryllus Otte & Perez-Gelabert, 2009
 Mexigryllus Gorochov, 2019
 Paranurogryllus Mesa & García-Novo, 1999
 Zebragryllus Desutter-Grandcolas & Cadena-Castañeda, 2014
subtribe Brachytrupina Saussure, 1877
 genus group Atsigryllae Cadena-Castañeda & García García, 2020 (Neotropical)
 Atsigryllus Cadena-Castañeda & Tíjaro, 2020
 genus group Gigagryllae Cadena-Castañeda & García García, 2020 (Neotropical)
 Gigagryllus Cadena-Castañeda & García García, 2020
 monotypic G. omayrae Cadena-Castañeda & García García, 2020
 Titanogryllus Jaiswara, Souza-Dias, Desutter-Grandcolas & de Mello, 2018
 genus group Megalogryllae Cadena-Castañeda & García García, 2020 (Neotropical)
 Megalogryllus Chopard, 1930
 genus group Miogryllae Cadena-Castañeda & García García, 2020 (Americas)
 Faguagryllus Cadena-Castañeda, 2011
 monotypic F. luteolus Cadena-Castañeda, 2011
 Gryllita Hebard, 1935
 Kazuemba de Mello, 1990
 monotypic K. walderi de Mello, 1990
 Miogryllus Saussure, 1877
 genus group Perugryllae Cadena-Castañeda & García García, 2020 (Neotropical)
 Laureopsis Jaiswara, 2017
 monotypic G. nauta Jaiswara, 2017
 Perugryllus Jaiswara, 2017
 genus group not determined:
 Apiotarsus Saussure, 1877
 Brachytrupes Serville, 1838
 Danielottea Koçak & Kemal, 2009
 Gryllodes Saussure, 1874
 Gymnogryllus Saussure, 1877
 Mayumbella Otte, 1987
 Phonarellus Gorochov, 1983
 Taciturna Otte, 1987
 Tarbinskiellus Gorochov, 1983
subtribe Cophogryllina Ichikawa, Murai & Honda, 2000 (Africa, Asia)
 Cophogryllus Saussure, 1877
 Goniogryllus Chopard, 1936
 Parasongella Otte, 1987
 Parasongella ornaticeps (Chopard, 1969)
 Qingryllus Chen & Zheng, 1995
subtribe Gryllina Laicharting, 1781
 Acheta Fabricius, 1775
 Gryllus Linnaeus, 1758 - type genus
 Scapsipedus Saussure, 1877
 Velarifictorus Randell, 1964
subtribe not determined
 Abmisha Otte, 1987
 Acanthogryllus Saussure, 1877
 Acanthoplistus Saussure, 1877
 Agryllus Gorochov, 1994
 Apterosvercus  Gorochov, 1992
 Clearidas Stål, 1876
 Conatrullus Gorochov, 2001
 Conoblemmus  Adelung, 1910
 Conogryllus Gorochov, 2001
 Crynculus Gorochov, 1996
 Damaracheta Otte, 1987
 Depressogryllus Gorochov, 1988
 Doroshenkoa Gorochov, 2004
 †Eogryllus Gorochov, 2012
 Ganoblemmus Karsch, 1893
 Gialaia Gorochov, 1994
 subgenus Eugialaia Gorochov, 2001
 subgenus Gialaia Gorochov, 1994
 Gryllodinus Bolívar, 1927
 Hemitrullus Gorochov, 2001
 Holoblemmus Bolívar, 1925
 Kurtguentheria Gorochov, 1996
 Loxoblemmus Saussure, 1877
 Macrogryllus Saussure, 1877
 Melanogryllus Chopard, 1961
 Mimicogryllus Gorochov, 1994
 Natalogryllus Gorochov & Mostovski, 2008
 Nigrogryllus Gorochov, 1983
 monotypic N. sibiricus (Chopard, 1925)
 Paraloxoblemmus Karny, 1907
 Pezoloxoblemmus Karny, 1907
 Plebeiogryllus Randell, 1964
 Poliogryllus Gorochov, 1984
 monotypic P. fuliginatus (Chopard, 1962)
 †Pronemobius Scudder, 1890
 Scapsipedoides Chopard, 1936
 Sigagryllus Otte & Cade, 1984
 monotypic S. camerunensis (Chopard, 1945)
 Sphecogryllus Chopard, 1933
 monotypic S. armatus Chopard, 1933
 Squamigryllus Gorochov, 2001
 monotypic S. squamipterus (Ingrisch, 1987)
 Svercus Gorochov, 1988
 monotypic S. palmetorum (Krauss, 1902)
 Tartarogryllus Tarbinsky, 1940
 Teleogryllus Chopard, 1961
 Trullus Gorochov, 1999
 Tympanogryllus Gorochov, 2001
 Vietacheta Gorochov, 1992

References

External links
 
 

Orthoptera tribes
Gryllinae